Betty Callish (August 24, 1886 – after 1941) was a Dutch-born actress, singer, and violinist who performed in Dutch, English, German, French and Italian. In 1941, as Roxo Betty Weingartner, she became a postulant of the Third Order Regular CSMV, a cloistered religious community at the Convent of St Thomas the Martyr in Oxford.

Early life 
Babette Calisch was born in Baarn, the daughter of Salomon Oreste Calisch and Aleida Oppenheim. Her parents were Jewish; her mother was a first cousin to Dutch feminist Aletta Jacobs. She knew Sarah Bernhardt from childhood, and on her advice studied acting, learned to play the violin, and trained as a singer in Berlin.

Career 

She started acting in London, as a student at Herbert Beerbohm Tree's academy, now known as the Royal Academy of Dramatic Art. In England, Callish appeared Lady Ben (1905), Leah Kleschna (1905), The Little Stranger (1906), A Waltz Dream (1911) and Orpheus in the Underground (1912). She was also seen in London productions of The Laughing Husband and Sadie Love; she appeared in both these shows on Broadway, as well, in 1914 and 1915. She starred in The Great Lover (1916) in Chicago. and in The King (1917-1918). "She is a pretty soubrette," commented American critic Burns Mantle, "who both sings and plays violin – pleasantly but neither with surpassing skill."

In 1941, after a divorce and a time in treatment for alcoholism, Betty Weingartner became a postulant at the Third Order Regular CSMV, a cloistered religious community at the Convent of St Thomas the Martyr in Oxford. There, she was known as "Marica".

Personal life 
Betty Callish married (in 1922) and divorced (by 1931) Austrian conductor Felix Weingartner; she was his fourth wife. He dedicated a symphony to her during their marriage. She was a confidante of Queen Marie of Romania. She died after 1941.

References

External links 
 
 
 A cigarette card featuring Betty Callish, in the George Arents Collection, New York Public Library

1886 births
Year of death missing
People from Baarn
Jewish actresses
Dutch violinists
20th-century Dutch women singers
Dutch stage actresses
20th-century Dutch actresses